The Bishop of Cork and Ross is an episcopal title which takes its name after the city of Cork and the County Cork town of Rosscarbery in the Republic of Ireland. The combined title was first used by the Church of Ireland from 1638 to 1660 and again from 1679 to 1835. At present the title is being used by the Roman Catholic Church.

Church of Ireland bishops
The Church of Ireland title was formed when the bishopric of Cork, Cloyne and Ross was separated in 1638 into bishopric of Cork and Ross and the bishopric of Cloyne. They were reunited in 1660, but again were separated in 1679. Since 1835, the sees of Cork, Cloyne and Ross have again been reunited under one bishop.

Roman Catholic bishops
The Roman Catholic title was formed by the union of the bishoprics of Cork and Ross on 19 April 1958.

The current bishop is the Most Reverend Fintan Gavin, Bishop of the Roman Catholic Diocese of Cork and Ross who was appointed by the Holy See on 8 April 2019 and was installed at the Cathedral of St Mary and St Anne, Cork, on 30 June 2019.

See also

Saint Finbarre's Cathedral, Cork (Church of Ireland)
Saint Fachtna's Cathedral, Ross (Church of Ireland)

References

Cork and Ross
Cork and Ross
Religion in County Cork
Roman Catholic Diocese of Cork and Ross
 Cork and Ross
Bishops of Cork or Cloyne or of Ross